Michael Mewshaw (born February 19, 1943) is an American author of 11 novels and 11 books of nonfiction, and works frequently as a travel writer, investigative reporter, book reviewer, and tennis reporter. His novel Year of the Gun was made into a film of the same name by John Frankenheimer in 1991. He is married with two sons.

Alan Cheuse, National Public Radio's longtime "voice of books," called him "the best novelist in America that nobody knows."

Background

Early life and education
Born in Washington, DC, and raised in the suburb of Prince George's County, Maryland, Mewshaw graduated Phi Beta Kappa from the University of Maryland, College Park (1965), then was granted a four-year fellowship to attend the graduate writing program at the University of Virginia, where he attained his Masters (1966) and Doctorate (1970) degrees under the tutelage of George Garrett. While studying at UVA, Mewshaw completed two unpublished novels, then embarked on a road trip across Mexico with his wife (at the urging of William Styron, who was the subject of his masters thesis and doctoral dissertation); a journey which would form the basis of his first novel Man in Motion (1970), which he completed while on a Fulbright Fellowship in France.

Early career
Mewshaw taught creative writing at the University of Massachusetts at Amherst, and subsequently was named Director of Creative writing at the University of Texas at Austin. Taking leaves of absence every other year from this post, Mewshaw based himself in Rome, Italy, and continued traveling throughout Europe and North Africa. While Mewshaw researched his third novel The Toll (1974) in Marrakesh, Morocco, his wife Linda was hired as Lindsay Wagner's stand-in on the set of Robert Wise's film Two People. Mewshaw's experience of that shoot was the jumping-off point for his fifth novel Land Without Shadow (1979).

Bibliography

Novels
Man in Motion (1970)
Waking Slow (1972)
The Toll (1974)
Earthly Bread (1976)
Land Without Shadow (1979)
Year of the Gun (1984)
Blackballed (1986)
True Crime (1991)
Shelter from the Storm (2003)
Island Tempest (2005)
Lying with the Dead (2009)

Nonfiction
Life for Death (1980)
Short Circuit: Six Months on the Men's Professional Tennis Tour (1983)
Money to Burn (1987)
Playing Away (1988)
Ladies of the Court: Grace And Disgrace On The Women's Tennis Tour (1993)
Do I Owe You Something?:  A Memoir of the Literary Life (2003)
If You Could See Me Now:  A Chronicle of Identity and Adoption (2006)
Between Terror and Tourism:  An Overland Trip Across North Africa (2010)
Sympathy for the Devil: Four Decades of Friendship with Gore Vidal (2014)
Ad In Ad Out: Collected Tennis Articles (2016)
The Lost Prince: A Search for Pat Conroy (2019)

Honors
Fulbright Fellow in Creative Writing to France, 1968–69
William Rainey Prize at Bread Loaf Writers' Conference, 1970
Wallace Stegner Fellowship, 1971
National Endowment for the Arts Grant, 1974
Visiting Artist at American Academy in Rome, 1975–76
Carr Collins Award for Best Non-Fiction Book of 1980
Guggenheim Grant, 1981–82
Visiting Artist, American Academy in Rome, 1980–83
Carr Collins Award for Best Non-Fiction Book of 1983
Book of the Year, Tennis Week, 1993
Runner-up, William Hill Award, Best Sports Book of the Year in England, 1993
Investigative Journalist of the Year, Tennis Week, 1997
Independent Bookseller's Award Best Novel of the Year, 2009 - Lying With The Dead
Longlist, PEN/Jacqueline Bograd Weld Award for Biography, 2020 - The Lost Prince

Footnotes

References
Mewshaw, Michael (2003). Do I Owe You Something?: A Memoir of the Literary Life.  Baton Rouge: Louisiana State University Press. .

External links
Charlie Rose interview with Michael Mewshaw about Gore Vidal and "Sympathy for the Devil"
Mewshaw speaks about "Sympathy for the Devil" at the American Library in Paris and takes questions from the audience
Ben Rothenberg interview with Mewshaw on "The Ugly Side of Tennis"

WNYC radio interview with Mewshaw about Shelter from the Storm
Archive of New York Times travel articles by Michael Mewshaw
Bookbrowse's interview with Mewshaw
Mewshaw's essay "Travel, Travel Writing, and the Literature of Travel" first presented as the plenary address at the 2004 South Central MLA Conference in New Orleans

20th-century American novelists
21st-century American novelists
American male novelists
1943 births
Living people
University of Maryland, College Park alumni
20th-century American male writers
21st-century American male writers